Falling Down a Mountain is the eighth studio album by English rock band Tindersticks, released in 2010 on 4AD/Constellation Records. The album peaked at number two in Greece, and achieved modest chart placings in other European countries.

Critical reception

The album was released to generally positive reviews. Drowned in Sound felt that Tindersticks have "created a record that certainly rivals, if not betters any of its three predecessors from the past decade". Pitchfork summed up the record by saying "it leaves a very hazy, almost spectral impression when it ends. But it's also warm and in some ways comforting, and it improves the more you listen to it and tease out the details in the songs." BBC Music described the album as "the sound of a band rediscovering themselves" and Uncut had a similar view, saying Tindersticks sounded like "a band with restored self-belief, again loving doing what they do better than anyone else". AllMusic said "Falling Down a Mountain isn't exactly a major reinvention, but it does back up the golden-hued sky gracing its cover with some of their most upbeat and optimistic songs to date". NME was more measured, describing the album as "a dislocated creature" but "the moments of oddness whetted our palette for more." PopMatters was equally unimpressed, calling it "the sound of Tindersticks going through the motions".

In 2011 it was awarded a silver certification from the Independent Music Companies Association which indicated sales of at least 20,000 copies throughout Europe.

Track listing
All songs written and composed by Stuart Staples except where indicated.

"Falling Down a Mountain" – 6:33
"Keep You Beautiful" – 3:23
"Harmony Around My Table" – 5:06
"Peanuts" (with Mary Margaret O'Hara) – 4:37
"She Rode Me Down" – 3:18
"Hubbards Hills" (Dan McKinna) – 3:04
"Black Smoke" – 3:43
"No Place So Alone" – 3:12
"Factory Girls" – 5:55
"Piano Music" – 5:46

Personnel
Stuart Staples – lead vocals, acoustic guitar
David Boulter – keyboards, percussion
Neil Fraser – guitar
Dan McKinna – bass, vocals
Terry Edwards – trumpet
Earl Harvin – drums
David Kitt – guitar, vocals

Charts

References

2010 albums
Tindersticks albums